Just Squaw is a 1919 American silent western drama film directed by George E. Middleton and starring Beatriz Michelena and Andrew Robson.

Cast
 Beatriz Michelena as Fawn
 William Pike as The Stranger
 Andrew Robson as Snake Le Gal
 Albert Morrison as 	The Half-Breed
 D. Mitsoras	as 	Romney

References

Bibliography
 Connelly, Robert B. The Silents: Silent Feature Films, 1910-36, Volume 40, Issue 2. December Press, 1998.
 Fregoso, Rosa Linda. Mexicana Encounters: The Making of Social Identities on the Borderlands. University of California Press, 2003.

External links
 

1919 films
1919 drama films
1910s English-language films
American silent feature films
Silent American drama films
American black-and-white films
Films directed by George E. Middleton
Film Booking Offices of America films
1910s American films